Oldaker is a surname. Notable people with the surname include:

Charles Oldaker (1887–1915), British gymnast
Darren Oldaker (born 1999), English footballer
Jamie Oldaker (1951–2020), American drummer, member of the country rock band The Tractors
Wilfrid Oldaker (1901–1978), English clergyman and headmaster